John Douglas "Jack" Pettigrew (2 October 1943 - 7 May 2019) was an Australian neuroscientist. He was Emeritus Professor of Physiology and Director of the Vision, Touch and Hearing Research Centre at the University of Queensland in Australia.

Research

Pettigrew's research interest was in comparative neuroscience. He studied a variety of different birds and mammals with modern neuronal tracing techniques to unravel principles of brain organization. He was the chief proponent of the flying primate hypothesis, which was based on the similarity between the brains of megabats and primates. Special emphasis was placed on the visual, auditory and somatosensory systems.

Pettigrew was the first person to clarify the neurobiological basis of stereopsis when he described neurones sensitive to binocular disparity. Later, he discovered that owls have independently evolved a system of binocular neurones like those found in mammals.

Pettigrew showed evidence for a role for non-visual pathways in the phenomenon of developmental  neuroplasticity during the postnatal critical period.

Pettigrew used binocular rivalry as an assay for interhemispheric switching, whose rhythm is altered in bipolar disorder.

Honours and awards

Pettigrew’s scientific work was recognized by several honours and awards, including becoming a Fellow of the Royal Society of London (FRS)in 1987, becoming a Fellow of the fellow of the Australian Academy of Science (FAAS) in the same year, and being awarded the Centenary Medal in 2001 for service to Australian society and science in phylogeny.

Other notable activity

In the 1960s and 1970s, Pettigrew was an accomplished rock climber. His most notable climb came in 1965 when together with Bryden Allen, John Davis, and David Witham he was the first to climb the 562 m (1,844 ft) high Ball's Pyramid, the tallest volcanic stack in the world.

References

External links

Researchers unmask the living brain
Mystery of the Min Min lights explained
New theory on manic-depression
Batman's place in evolution
The man in the bat
Megabats, microbats and the most interesting gene in the genome

1943 births
2019 deaths
Academic staff of the University of Queensland
University of Sydney alumni
Fellows of the Royal Society
Fellows of the Australian Academy of Science
Recipients of the Centenary Medal
Bipolar disorder researchers